The longnose spurdog (Squalus blainville) is a dogfish shark of the genus Squalus, found over continental shelves in all oceans, at depths of between 15 and 800 metres.  They reach one metre in length.

References

 
 Tony Ayling & Geoffrey Cox, Collins Guide to the Sea Fishes of New Zealand,  (William Collins Publishers Ltd, Auckland, New Zealand 1982) 

Squalus
Fish described in 1827